Qiu Ying (1494 – 1552) was a Chinese painter of the Ming dynasty who specialised in the gongbi brush technique.

Early life 
Qiu Ying's courtesy name was Shifu, and his art name was Shizhou. He was born to a peasant family in Taicang. Moving with his family to Suzhou (蘇州), Qiu Ying was apprenticed as a lacquer artisan. Despite his family's humble origins, he had natural talent and skill in painting. He later learned the art of painting from the famous artist Zhou Chen (周臣, ca. 1450–1535) and imitated ancient works of Tang (618-907) and Song (960-1279) dynasties, becoming so successful that his copies and the originals were indistinguishable.

Career 
He painted with the support a few of wealthy patrons. Three of his best patrons were art collectors. One was Chen Guan (?–after 1557), from Suzhou. The other two were both younger than Qiu: Zhou Fenglai (1523–1555), from nearby Kunshan, and the well-known wealthy collector Xiang Yuanbian (1525–1590), whose home was in Jiaxing in Zhejiang Province. With his special gift for copying paintings, Qiu Ying found favour among collectors, bringing him an opportunity to copy and learn from Song and Yuan dynasty paintings in the collections of the Jiangnan area and greatly broadening his artistic scope. As Qiu Ying's skills in painting matured, a style of his own gradually emerged and took form. 

Though Suzhou's Wu School encouraged painting in ink washes, Qiu Ying also painted in the blue-and-green style and incorporated different techniques into his paintings. His paintings on figure, landscape, and flower subjects all therefore have an originality of his own. Qiu Ying's use of the brush was meticulous and elegant, and his depictions of landscapes and figures were orderly and well-proportioned. In addition to his paintings being elegant and refined, they also are quite decorative. Qiu Ying's painting style it also has the delicately graceful air of literati art as well.

His talent and versatility allowed him to become regarded as one of the Four Masters of the Ming dynasty.

Furthermore, accompanying the great economic expansion that took place in the middle of the Ming dynasty, Qiu Ying's paintings were imitated in large numbers during his own lifetime to meet the demand for his art, his name added to untold numbers of works done by professional artists.

The most famous really painted by Qiu Ying are Harp player in a pavilion (now at the Museum of Fine Arts in Boston) and The Emperor Guangwu Fording a River (National Gallery of Canada) and the frequently reproduced Dwellings of the Immortals - Jade Cave FairyLand are located in The Palace Museum in Forbidden City in Beijing in China. And for example the popular Journey to Shu (also known as Emperor Minghuang's Journey to Sichuan) "flagship" painting in the blue-and-green style (Smithsonian's National Museum of Asian Art in Washington D.C.) is a copy of a landscape painted by Qiu Ying, which in turn was a copy of several hundred years older famous landscape of the same title, which was also a copy... (See the painting gallery: Emperor Ming-huang's Flight to Sichuan).

Personal life 
His daughter, Qiu Zhu (仇珠, fl. 16th c.), and son-in-law, You Qiu (尤求, fl. 16th c.), followed him in painting. Qiu Zhu's style is delicate and beautifully refined, while You Qiu also inherited his father-in-law's manner but especially excelled at “baimiao (白描)” fine-line figure painting in ink.

Collections 
Work attributed to Qiu Ying is held in the permanent collections of several museums worldwide, including the Princeton University Art Museum, the Indianapolis Museum of Art, the University of Michigan Museum of Art, the Penn Museum, the Museum of Fine Arts, Boston, the Nelson-Atkins Museum of Art, and the British Museum.

Gallery

Notes

References
 Ci hai bian ji wei yuan hui. Ci hai. Shanghai: Shanghai ci shu chu ban she, 1979.

Ming dynasty painters
1494 births
1552 deaths
Painters from Suzhou
People from Taicang